Jennifer Ellen Johnson née Brown (born October 25, 1948) is a former wheelchair basketball player and a para table tennis player. She developed polio at the age of five in Jamaica. She has represented Jamaica at the Paralympics from 1968 to 1980 and then represented the United States at the Paralympics from 1984 to 2004. She was married to Denton Johnson before his death.

Sporting career
Johnson first started playing ball sports in her teens, she was introduced to a lot of sports and was interested in table tennis. She participated for home nation Jamaica at the 1972 Summer Paralympics in Heidelberg, Germany and won a silver medal in wheelchair basketball. Johnson's family immigrated to the United States after the 1972 Summer Paralympics, she joined the Paralympic table tennis team in 1983 and one year later won two silver medals in the 1984 Summer Paralympics along with Pamela Fontaine.

References

1948 births
Sportspeople from Westchester County, New York
American sportspeople of Jamaican descent
Paralympic table tennis players of the United States
Table tennis players at the 1984 Summer Paralympics
Table tennis players at the 1988 Summer Paralympics
Table tennis players at the 1992 Summer Paralympics
Table tennis players at the 1996 Summer Paralympics
Table tennis players at the 2000 Summer Paralympics
Table tennis players at the 2004 Summer Paralympics
Medalists at the 1972 Summer Paralympics
Medalists at the 1984 Summer Paralympics
Medalists at the 1988 Summer Paralympics
Medalists at the 1996 Summer Paralympics
Living people
Sportswomen
Paralympic medalists in wheelchair basketball
Paralympic medalists in table tennis
Paralympic medalists for Jamaica
Paralympic gold medalists for the United States
Paralympic silver medalists for the United States
Paralympic bronze medalists for the United States
Medalists at the 2015 Parapan American Games
People from Mandeville, Jamaica
American female table tennis players